The Dean and Canons of Windsor are the ecclesiastical body of St George's Chapel at Windsor Castle.

Foundation

The college of canons was established in 1348 by Letters Patent of King Edward III. It was formally constituted on the feast of St Andrew the Apostle, 30 November 1352, when the statutes drawn up by William Edington, bishop of Winchester, as papal delegate, were solemnly delivered to William Mugge, the warden of the college.

Accepting that the process of foundation took several years to complete, the college takes the year 1348 as its formal date of foundation.

Costume
Three ancient monumental brasses survive depicting canons of Windsor, wearing the mantle of the Order of the Garter, purple in colour, with a circular badge on the left shoulder, displaying: Argent, a cross gules (a Saint George's Cross):
c. 1370. Roger Parkers, North Stoke, Oxfordshire (half effigy with inscription; head lost).
1540. Roger Lupton, LL.D., Provost of Eton College and Canon of Windsor. Eton College Chapel (mantle worn over fur-lined cassock; no surplice).
1558. Arthur Cole, S.T.B., President of Magdalen, at Magdalen College, Oxford. Showing a very ornate mantle worn over cassock and surplice.
The long cords which fasten the mantle are well represented at North Stoke and Magdalen College. In the two later examples it is gathered. On the Eton brass the mantle is fastened at the neck. The lost effigy of John Robyns, d. 1558, of which the inscription remains in St George's Chapel, may have shown him wearing the mantle. Brasses of canons of Windsor are found showing them vested in copes, without the Garter badge, as at Thurcaston, Leicestershire. (John Mershdcn, 1425), and at Harrow (Simon Marcheford, 1442). A brass was discovered in 1890 at Bennington, near Stevenage, Hertfordshire, showing a small mutilated effigy of a priest in a cope with a round badge (possibly a rose) on the left shoulder. The cope has an orphrey. This has been supposed to represent a Canon of Windsor.

Suspension of canonries
Section 9 of the Ecclesiastical Commissioners Act 1840 provided for the suspension of eight of the canonries at St George's. It required that the first two vacant canonries should be suspended, the next filled, the next two suspended, the next filled, the next two suspended, the next filled, and the next two suspended.

Current chapter
As of 2 January 2021:

 Dean of Windsor — David Conner (since 1998)
 Vice-Dean, Canon Treasurer, and Warden, St George's House — Hueston Finlay (canon since 25 September 2004 and warden since September 2005; steward 2006–2009; treasurer since 2012; Vice-Dean since before July 2017)
 Canon Precentor and Chaplain — Martin Poll (canon and chaplain since 1 October 2012 installation; precentor since before July 2017)
 Canon Steward — Mark Powell (since 1 February 2016 installation)

Minor Canons
 Succentor and School Chaplain — Jonathan Coore

Deans of Windsor

See Dean of Windsor for chronological list.

Canons of the First Stall

1. Hugh Whytchirche 1352–1375
2. John Landyran 1376
3. Richard de Bokelly, alias Flandreyn 1376–1377
4. William Dole 1377–1403
5. William Lane 1403–1404
6. Walter Mabeley 1404–1407
7. Robert Wolveden 1407–1412
8. Thomas Hanley 1412–1413
9. John Meresden, Mersdon or Mershden 1413–1425
10. Roger Gates 1425–1430
11. John Pye 1430–1439
12. William Brewster 1439–1465
13. Thomas Downe 1465–1479
14. John Arundel 1479–1496
15. Thomas Jane 1496–1500
16. William Cokkes 1500–1512
17. Robert Birkenshaw or Bekensall 1512–1525
18. Miles Welles or Wyllen 1526–1535
19. Simon Symonds 1535–1551
20. Richard Turner 1551–1553
21. William Este 1554–1557
22. William Pye 1557
23. John Bowles or Bockle 1557–1558
24. Edward Morecroft 1560–1580
25. John King 1580–1607
26. Mordecai (Murdoch) Alden 1607–1615
27. John King 1615–1638
28. Samuel Baker 1638–1639
29. Thomas Browne 1639–1673
30. Robert Young 1673–1716
31. William Derham 1716–1735
32. George Stephens 1735–1751
33. Balthasar Regis 1751–1757
34. John Bostock 1757–1786
35. John Fisher 1786–1803
36. William Beaumont Busby 1803–1808
37. Hon. Henry Ryder 1808–1812
38. Hon. Henry Cockayne Cust 1813–1861

Canonry of the First Stall suspended 1861 by Act of 1840.

Canons of the Second Stall

1. William de Polmorva 1352–1362
2. John Aleyn 1362–1368
3. Adam de Hertyngdon 1368–1380
4. Robert de More 1376
5. Walter (or William) Almaly or Almary 1380–1381
6. John Bouland 1381–1400
7. Edmund Lacey 1401–1417
8. John Longville 1417–1426
9. Alan Kirketon, or Kynton 1426–1443
10. Pagan (Payn) Burghill 1443–1474
11. Thomas Pallet 1474–1488
12. Richard Arnold 1488–1491
13. Thomas Bowde 1491–1504
14. Robert Honiwood 1504–1523
15. Richard Rawson 1523–1543
16. John Robins 1543–1558
17. Robert Iseham 1558–1560
18. Paul French 1560–1600
19. Henry Beaumont 1600–1622
20. Thomas Some 1622–1644
21. Edward Fulham 1660–1694
22. Maurice Vaughan 1695–1722
23. Peniston Booth 1722–1729
24. Robert Friend 1729–1737
25. Matthew Hutton 1737–1739
26. William Burchett 1739–1750
27. Thomas Hinton 1751–1757
28. John Lockman 1759–1807
29. Charles Digby 1808–1841

Canonry of the Second Stall then suspended by Act of 1840.

Canons of the Third Stall

1. Richard Rothley 1352–1362
2. John Leek 1362–1369
3. Thomas de Aston 1369–1376
4. John Massingham 1376–1408
5. John Malvern 1408–1416
6. John Corynham, or Coringham 1416–1444
7. Henry Hansherd or Hansard 1444–1446
8. Richard Willys 1446–1467
9. Clement Smith 1467–1471
10. John Cressy 1471
11. William Dudley 1471 (appointed Dean in 1473)
12. John Seymour 1471–1501
13. Geoffrey Symeon 1501–1508
14. Richard Rawlins 1508–1523
15. William Tate 1523–1540
16. Owen Oglethorpe 1540–1554
17. William Denys or Devenish 1554–1559
18. Simon Alleyn 1559–1563
19. John Thompson 1563–1571
20. William Wickham 1571–1584
21. William Wilson 1584–1615
22. Richard Langley 1615
23. Oliver Lloyd 1615–1617
24. Richard Montague 1617–1628
25. David Stokes 1628–1669
26. Henry Wotton 1669–1671
27. Gregory Hascard 1671–1684
28. Edward Jones 1684–1737
29. Lord James Beauclerk 1738–1746
30. Frederick Cornwallis 1746–1750
31. Walter Harte 1750–1774
32. James King 1774–1776
33. Thomas Bray 1776–1785
34. Henry William Majendie 1785–1798
35. Samuel Goodenough 1798–1802
36. George Champagne 1802–1828
37. Richard Adolphus Musgrave 1828–1841

Canonry of the Third Stall suspended by Act of 1840.

Canons of the Fourth Stall

1. Roger Parker 1353–1355
2. Stephen Scaldeford (Shalford) alias Brunkter 1355–1378
3. Thomas de Lynton 1378–1387
4. John Notyngham 1387–1389
5. Thomas Haule or Hauley 1389–1399
6. Robert Ravendale 1399–1404
7. William Asshrigge 1404–1405
8. Geoffrey Melton 1405–1411
9. Henry Drayton 1411–1413
10. William Lochard 1413–1431
11. John Brydbroke 1431–1444
12. William Mychell 1444–1463
13. Leyson Geffrey 1463–1474
14. John Marshall 1474–1478
15. William Corkys 1478–1487
16. Thomas Fraunces 1487–1500
17. John Esterfield 1500–1513
18. Christopher Plummer 1513–1535
19. James Blythe 1536–1546
20. Henry Aglionby 1546–1554
21. William Saxey 1554–1566
22. Anthony Rushe 1566–1577
23. Herbert Westfaling 1577–1586
24. Alexander Southayke 1586–1606
25. John Buckeridge 1606–1628
26. Gilbert Primrose 1628–1642
27. Hugh Paulinus de Cressy 1642–1646 (not installed)
Interregnum 1646–1660
28. John Lloyd 1660–1671
29. John Saumares 1671–1697
30. Samuel Pratt 1697–1723
31. Henry Bland 1723–1733
32. Hugh Lewis 1733–1742
33. Richard Terrick 1742–1749
34. Richard Newcome 1749–1755
35. Lord Francis Seymour 1755–1766
36. Thomas Hurdis 1766–1784
37. Folliott Herbert Walker Cornewall 1784–1793
38. Hon. William Stuart 1793–1800
39. George Heath 1800–1822
40. Hon. Richard Bagot 1822–1827
41. David Frederick Markham 1827–1853

Canonry suspended by Act of 1840.

Canons of the Fifth Stall

1. Reginald Lodington 1351–1365
2. Stephen de Estnore 1365–1368
3. John Saxton 1368–1382
4. Nicholas Slake 1382–1394
5. William Spigurnell 1394–1425
6. John Snell 1425–1431
7. Thomas Damet or Dannet 1431–1436
8. Richard Wyot 1436–1449
9. John Arundel 1449–1459
10. Richard Bowyer 1459–1471
11. John Vaughan 1471–1499
12. Richard Payne 1499–1507
13. William Atkinson 1507–1509
14. John Chambre (Chamber) 1509–1549
15. Ottuell (Ottiwell) Hollinshed 1550–1554
16. John Browne 1554–1572
17. Robert Johnson 1572–1625
18. John King 1625–1638
19. William Brough 1638–1671
20. Peter Scot (Scott) 1671–1689
21. John Hern 1690–1707
22. Thomas Goddard 1707–1731
23. William George 1731–1748
24. Theophilus Lowe 1748–1769
25. Thomas Dampier 1769–1774
26. John James Majendie 1774–1783
27. Hon. George Hamilton 1783–1787
28. William Langford 1787–1814
29. Charles Proby 1814–1859
30. Hon. Charles Leslie Courtenay 1859–1894
31. Richard Gee 1894–1902
32. Clement Smith 1902–1921
33. Vacancy 1921–1974
34. Anthony Oakley Dyson 1974–1977
35. Vacancy 1977–1981
36. John David Treadgold 1981 – 1989
37. Michael Anthony Moxon 1990 – 1998
38. Barry Thompson 1998–2004
39. Hueston Edward Finlay 2004 –

Canons of the Sixth Stall

1. Reginald Garderobe 1353–1354
2. Richard de Bokelly, alias Flanderyn 1354–1376 (then Canon of the First Stall)
3. Richard Shawe 1376–1403
4. Richard Prentys 1403–1404
5. John Ailleston or Ayleston 1404–1405
6. John Exton 1405–1430
7. John Depeden 1430–1460
8. James Goldwell 1460–1472
9. Thomas Danett 1472–1481
10. Robert Morton 1481–1486
11. John Stokes 1486–1503
12. William Butler 1503–1519
13. John Longland 1519–1520
14. Thomas Magnus 1520–1547
15. Richard Cox 1548–1553
16. William Chedsey 1554–1559
17. George Whitehorne 1559–1565
18. Edmund Freke 1565–1572
19. Hugh Blythe 1572–1610
20. Thomas Frith 1610–1631
21. Daniel Collins 1631–1648
 Interregnum 1648–1660
22. William Chamberlain 1660–1666
23. Richard Milward 1666–1680
24. Thomas Sprat 1681–1684
25. John Wickart 1684–1722
26. Richard Sleech 1722–1730
27. Michael Stanhope 1730–1737
28. John Ewer 1738–1774
29. John Hallam 1775–1811
30. Hon. Richard Bruce Stopford 1812–1844
31. Frederick Anson 1845–1885
32. John Neale Dalton 1885–1931
33. Harry William Blackburne 1931–1934
34. Arthur Stafford Crawley 1934–1948
35. Edward Malcolm Venables 1948–1957
36. James Atherton Fisher 1958–1978
37. David John Burgess 1978–1987
38. Alan Alfred Coldwells 1987–1995
39. Laurence Gunner 1996  – 2006
40. Dr James Woodward 2009 - 2015

Canons of the Seventh Stall

1. Robert Burnham (Bernham) 1351–1362
2. Hugh de Briddeham 1363–1372
3. Richard Raundes (Randes) 1372–1400
4. Richard Kingston (Kyngeston) 1400–1402
5. Henry Spicer (Spisour) 1402–1437
6. John Kette 1437–1452
7. John Hore 1452–1474
8. Edmund Audley 1474–1480
9. Oliver Dynham (Denham) 1480–1500
10. Roger Lupton 1500–1540
11. John London 1540–1543
12. Francis Mallett 1543–1570
13. Roger Browne 1571–1601
14. John Chamber 1601–1604
15. Richard Field 1604–1616
16. Edmund Wilson 1616–1617
17. Godfrey Goodman 1617–1656
 Interregnum 1656–1660
18. George Hall 1660–1662
19. Henry Carpenter 1662
20. Peter Mews 1662–1673
21. Thomas Doughty 1673–1701
22. George Verney, 12th Baron Willoughby de Broke, 1701–1714
23. John Pelling 1715–1750
24. John Fulham 1750–1777
25. Anthony Shepherd 1777–1796
26. Thomas Powys 1796–1797
27. Edward Northey 1797–1828
28. William Canning 1828–1860

Canonry suspended in 1860 by Act of 1840.

Canons of the Eighth Stall

1. Whitecroft or Wythecroft 1353–1361
2. William de Mulsho (Moulsoe) 1361–1368
3. Adam de Hertyngdon (Hartington) 1368
4. Richard de Hankedon or Launceston 1368–1379
5. John Prust or Prest 1379–1403
6. Roger Redeburne 1403–1406
7. John Eston 1406–1422
8. Peter de Alcobasse 1422–1427
9. Thomas Southwell 1428–1431
10. William Bonetemps 1431–1442
11. Nicholas Sturgeon 1442–1454
12. William Sharpe 1454–1455
13. John Kirkeby or Kerby 1455–1457
14. John Wygryme 1457–1468
15. Robert Wodmanston 1468–1469
16. Baldwin Hyde 1469–1472
17. David Hopton 1472–1492
18. Christopher Urswick 1492–1496
19. Richard Nix (Nykke) 1497–1501
20. Thomas Hobbs 1502–1507
21. Robert Fisher 1509–1510
22. Thomas Wolsey 1511–1514
23. Geoffrey Wren 1514–1527
24. Robert Shorton (or Shurton) 1527–1535
25. Simon Haynes 1535–1552
26. John Somer 1554–1573
27. John Wolward 1574–1598
28. Charles Sonibancke 1598–1638
29. James Rowlandson 1638–1639
30. John Hales 1639–1656 (ejected 1642)
Interregnum 1656–1660
31. Anthony Hawles 1660–1664
32. John Durell 1664–1677
33. Richard Meggot 1677–1692
34. Thomas Manningham 1693–1709
35. John Mandevile 1709–1722
36. Nathaniel Marshall 1722–1730
37. Robert Tyrwhit 1730–1472
38. Edmund Gibson 1742–1746
39. William Gibson 1746–1754
40. Richard Blacow 1754–1760
41. Edward Barnard 1760–1781
42. Jonathan Davies 1782–1791
43. William Cookson 1792–1820
44. John Keate 1820–1852

Canonry of the Eighth Stall suspended by the Act of 1840.

Canons of the Ninth Stall

1. John de Storteford 1352–1353
2. Edmund Clovil 1353–1387
3. John Drake 1387–1391
4. William Falewell 1391–1397
5. Thomas Marton 1397–1407
6. Simon Marcheford (Marchand) 1407–1441
7. William Walesby 1441–1450
8. Richard Andrew 1450–1455
9. William Harmer (Hermer) 1455–1473
10. John Coryngdon 1473–1476
11. John Dunmow (Dunmoe or Dumoe) 1476–1488
12. Richard Surland 1488–1509
13. James Denton 1509–1533
14. Richard Wolman 1533–1537
15. Richard Arche 1538–1553
16. William Horwood 1554–1555
17. Thomas Rawe 1555–1556
18. Richard Bruerne (Brewarne) 1557–1563
19. William Day 1563–1572
20. William King 1572–1590
21. Erasmus Webb 1590–1614
22. Thomas Sheafe 1614–1639
23. John Pocklington 1639–1641
24. Herbert Croft 1641–1662
25. John Heaver 1662–1670
26. Thomas Vyner 1670–1673
27. Isaac Vossius 1673–1689
28. John Mesnard (Maynard) 1689–1727
29. Daniel Waterland 1727–1740
30. John Fountayne 1741–1748
31. Richard Wilmot 1748–1772
32. Philip Duval 1772–1808
33. Joseph Goodall 1808–1840
34. Lord Wriothesley Russell 1840–1886
35. Philip Frank Eliot 1886–1891
36. Constantine Charles Henry Phipps, 3rd Marquis of Normanby 1891–1907
37. Edgar Sheppard 1907–1921
38. Samuel Mumford Taylor 1921–1929
39. Anthony Charles Deane 1929–1946
40. Duncan Armytage 1947–1954
41. Charles Ritchie 1954–1958
42. Robert Henry Hawkins 1958 – 1970
43. Stephen Edmund Verney 1970–1977
44. Derek Ian Tennent Eastman 1977 – 1985
45. Derek M Stanesby 1985–1997
46. John Anthony Ovenden 1998–2012
47. Martin George Poll 2012–
 current

Canons of the Tenth Stall

1. Robert Shutlingdon 1352–1353
2. John de Newbery 1353–1355
3. Henry Warner, alias Blunt 1355–1368
4. John Aleyn 1368–1373
5. Richard Postell 1373–1400
6. Robert Gough (Gowe) 1400–1432
7. William Brewster 1432–1437
8. Robert Thurgarton 1437–1438
9. John Howden 1438–1449
10. Thomas Passhe 1449–1489
11. William Creton (Cretyng) 1489–1519
12. Richard Sydnor 1519–1534
13. Robert Aldrich (Aldridge) 1534–1537
14. Henry Williams 1537–1554
15. Thomas Slythurst 1554–1559
16. Henry Ryley 1560–1586
17. William Harrison 1586–1593
18. Thomas White 1593–1624
19. Nathaniel Giles 1624–1644
Interregnum 1644–1660
20. George Evans 1660–1702
21. William Fleetwood 1702–1708
22. John Adams 1708–1720
23. William Wade 1720–1733
24. Edmund Marten (Martin) 1733–1751
25. Erasmus Saunders 1751–1756
26. James Yorke 1756–1762
27. Robert Hort 1762–1773
28. William Buller 1773–1784
29. Edward Wilson 1784–1804
30. William Long 1804–1835

Canonry of the Tenth Stall suspended by the Act of 1840.

Canons of the Eleventh Stall

1. John Northampton (Norhampton) 1352–1355
2. Thomas Madefray 1355–1375
3. Richard Mitford (Medeford) 1375–1381 and 1381–1390
4. William de Pakyngton 1381
5. Richard Feld (Atfeld) 1390–1401
6. William Gyloth (Gillot) 1401–1428
7. Robert Felton 1428–1432
8. Robert Allerton 1432–1437
9. Henry Hanslap (Hanslope) 1437–1452
10. Roger Misterton 1452–1469
11. Alexander Lee (Leigh) 1469–1480
12. Oliver King 1480–1503
13. William Atwater 1504–1514
14. James Malett 1514–1543
15. Arthur Cole 1543–1558
16. Edmund Johnson 1560
17. Richard Ryve (Reve) 1560–1594
18. Alexander Nowell 1594–1602
19. Edmund Nuttall 1602–1616
20. Thomas Horne 1616–1636
21. Thomas Howell 1636–1644
22. Ralph Brideoake 1660–1678
23. John Rosewell 1678–1684
24. William Cave 1684–1713
25. Andrew Snape 1713–1742
26. Samuel Haynes 1743–1752
27. Hon. Frederick Keppel 1754–1762
28. John Douglas 1762–1776
29. Hon. Shute Barrington 1776–1782
30. Frederick Dodsworth 1782–1821
31. James Stanier Clarke 1821–1834
32. Edward Moore 1834–1876
33. Hugh Pearson 1876–1882
34. William Boyd Carpenter 1882–1884
35. Edward Capel Cure 1884–1890
36. Alfred Barry 1891–1910
37. Hon. Leonard Francis Tyrwhitt 1910–1921
38. Alexander Nairne 1921–1936
39. Sidney Leslie Ollard 1936–1948
40. Alexander Roper Vidler 1948–1956
41. Geoffrey Bryan Bentley 1957–1982
42. John Austin White, CVO 1982 – 2012
43. Mark Powell 2016 – current

Canons of the Twelfth Stall

1. Walter Nothurst 1353–1360
2. John Loryng (Lorenges, Lothereyn) 1360–1387
3. Thomas Butiller (Boteler) 1387–1389 (appointed Dean 1389)
4. John Boor 1389–1402
5. Thomas More 1402–1422
6. Thomas Duryche 1422–1435
7. Thomas Lisieux (Lyseux or Lysures) 1435–1442
8. John Drury (Drewery, alias Salisbury) 1442–1446
9. John Bury 1446–1472
10. William Towres (Towrys, Tours) 1472–1485
11. Thomas Hutton 1485–1487
12. John Baily (Baylie) 1488–1495
13. Edward Willoughby 1495–1508
14. John Oxenbridge 1509–1522
15. Gamaliel Clifton 1522–1541
16. Anthony Barker 1541–1551
17. Nicholas Udall 1551–1554
18. William Ermested 1554–1558
19. George Mason 1560–1562
20. William Harward 1562–1589
21. Robert (Richard) Chaloner 1589–1621
22. Thomas Oates 1621–1623
23. John Elly (Ellis) 1623–1639
24. George Gillingham 1639–1668
25. John Butler 1669–1682
26. John Barrow 1682–1684
27. John Fitzwilliams 1685–1691
28. John Hartcliffe 1691–1712
29. Francis Brown 1713–1724
30. James Barclay 1724–1750
31. John Sumner 1751–1772
32. John Foster 1772–1773
33. Roger Mostyn 1774–1775
34. Montague North 1775–1779
35. William Arnald 1779–1802
36. Hon. Edward Legge 1802–1805
37. Hon. Jacob Marsham 1805–1840

Twelfth Stall suspended under the Act of 1840.

References

Windsor Castle
1348 establishments in England
1352 establishments in England
 
People associated with Sandleford, Berkshire
Church of England lists